The ICF Canoe Slalom World Championships are an international event in canoeing organized by the International Canoe Federation. The World Championships have taken place every year in non-Summer Olympic years since 2002. From 1949 to 1999, they had taken place in odd-numbered years. The 2001 championships were scheduled to take place in Ducktown, Tennessee (East of Chattanooga) from 20 to 23 September, but were canceled in the wake of the September 11 attacks.

Men race in single kayaks (K1) and single canoes (C1) both individually and in teams. Women race in K1 both individually and in teams and since the 2010 championships also in C1 individually. A team event was scheduled for those championships, but it was canceled because of weather conditions. The first women's C1 team event took place at the 2011 world championships, but no medals were awarded. The first medals in this event were awarded in 2013.

The men's C2 event was removed from the World Championships before the 2018 edition. The mixed C2 event was reinstated in 2017 after a 36-year hiatus. The extreme K1 events for men and women were first introduced in 2017.

Summary

Lists of medalists
 List of ICF Canoe Slalom World Championships medalists in men's canoe
 List of ICF Canoe Slalom World Championships medalists in men's kayak
 List of ICF Canoe Slalom World Championships medalists in mixed canoe
 List of ICF Canoe Slalom World Championships medalists in women's canoe
 List of ICF Canoe Slalom World Championships medalists in women's kayak

Most successful paddlers
Top 10 male and female paddlers with the best medal record including the team events are listed below. Boldface denotes active paddlers and the highest number of medals per type, as of the 2022 championships.

Men

Women

Most successful paddlers in individual events
Top 10 male and female paddlers with the best medal record excluding the team events are listed below. Boldface denotes active paddlers and the highest number of medals per type. As of the 2022 championships.

Men

Women

Medal table
As of the 2022 Championships.

Russian athletes competed under the flag of the Russian Canoe Federation at the 2021 World Championships.

See also 
 Canoe slalom
 Canoe Slalom World Cup
 ICF World Junior and U23 Canoe Slalom Championships
 ICF Canoe Slalom World Rankings
 ICF Canoe Marathon World Championship
 ICF Canoe Sprint World Championships
 Canoeing at the Summer Olympics

References

 
Recurring sporting events established in 1949
Canoe slalom
Slalom